"I Woke Up in Love This Morning" is a song written by L. Russell Brown and Irwin Levine and recorded by The Partridge Family for their 1971 album, Sound Magazine. It went to number 13 on the Billboard Hot 100 in 1971; it hit number 4 in Canada.

Cash Box called it a "splendidly commercial outing."

Chart performance

Weekly charts

Year-end charts

Later versions
David Cassidy on 1998 album, Old Trick New Dog
Doug Powell on the Not Lame 2002 bubblegum cover compilation, Right to Chews
Ron Miles on his 2006 album, Blossom/Stone
Max Romeo
Weezer as a Japanese bonus track on their 2009 album, Raditude
The Persuasions acapella version on their 1985 album, no Frills

References

External links
 

1971 singles
1971 songs
The Partridge Family songs
Weezer songs
Songs written by L. Russell Brown
Bell Records singles
Songs written by Irwin Levine
Song recordings produced by Wes Farrell